Bald Mountain, or Rondaxe Mountain, is a part of the Adirondack Mountains in the U.S. state of New York. The trail leading up the mountain is a popular hike, likely due to its proximity to tourist towns (such as Old Forge, NY). The mountain is also home to the Rondaxe Mountain Fire Tower, which contributes to the trail's popularity.

History
Bald Mountain was used by Verplanck Colvin in the 1870s as a survey point. Colvin suggested in 1886 that the summit take the name "Mt. St. Louis".

Official name 
Bald Mountain is the name most commonly used today, but it was officially renamed Rondaxe Mountain in 1912, when a fire tower was erected on a mountain in Croghan with the same name. The name Rondaxe was taken from the nearby Rondaxe Lake.

Hiking
The trail is just under a mile long and climbs 500 feet in elevation.  The fire tower is the most popular in the Adirondacks, with over 15,000 visitors annually.

References

External links
 Friends of Bald Mountain Tower restoration work including photos
 Adirondack Journeys Hiking guide and history

Upstate New York
Adirondack Park
Wilderness areas in Adirondack Park
Mountains of New York (state)
Hiking trails in New York (state)
Mountains of Herkimer County, New York